Dana Gillespie (born Richenda Antoinette de Winterstein Gillespie, 30 March 1949) is an English actress, singer and songwriter. Originally performing and recording in her teens, over the years Gillespie has been involved in the recording of over 70 albums, and appeared in stage productions, such as Jesus Christ Superstar, and several films.  Her musical output has progressed from teen pop and folk in the early part of her career, to rock in the 1970s and, more latterly, the blues.

Career
Gillespie was born in Woking, Surrey, the second daughter of Anne Francis Roden (née Buxton) Winterstein Gillespie (1920–2007) and Hans Henry Winterstein Gillespie (1910–1994), a London-based radiologist of Austrian nobility. Her older sister, Nicola Henrietta St. John Gillespie, was born in 1946. Dana Gillespie was the British Junior Water Skiing Champion in 1962.

She recorded initially in the folk genre in the mid-1960s. Some of her recordings as a teenager fell into the teen pop category, such as her 1965 single "Thank You Boy", written by John Carter and Ken Lewis and produced by Jimmy Page. Page also played, uncredited, on Gillespie's debut LP, Foolish Seasons. Her acting career got under way shortly afterwards, and it overshadowed her musical career in the late 1960s and 1970s.

The song "Andy Warhol" was originally written by David Bowie for Gillespie, who recorded it in 1971, but her version of the song was not released until 1973 on her album Weren't Born a Man. Her version also featured Mick Ronson on guitar. After performing backing vocals on the track "It Ain't Easy" from Bowie's Ziggy Stardust and the Spiders from Mars, she recorded an album produced by Bowie and Mick Ronson in 1973, Weren't Born a Man. Subsequent recordings have been in the blues genre, appearing with the London Blues Band. She is also notable for being the original Mary Magdalene in the first London production of Andrew Lloyd Webber and Tim Rice's Jesus Christ Superstar, which opened at the Palace Theatre in 1972. She also appeared on the Original London Cast album. During the 1980s Gillespie was a member of the Austrian Mojo Blues Band.

She is a follower of the late Indian spiritual guru Sri Sathya Sai Baba. She performed at his Indian ashram on various occasions and has also recorded thirteen bhajan-based albums in Sanskrit.

Gillespie is the organiser of the annual Blues festival at Basil's Bar on Mustique in the Caribbean, for fifteen days at the end of January and it is now in its eighteenth year. The house band is the London Blues Band, which consists of Dino Baptiste (piano), Jake Zaitz (guitar), Mike Paice (saxophone), Jeff Walker (bass), and Evan Jenkins (drums) but there are also many other acts. In 2005, Mick Jagger appeared as a guest and sang songs such as: "Honky Tonk Women", "Dust My Broom" and "Goin' Down" but also many other Blues artists have appeared there through the years, such as Big Joe Louis, Joe Louis Walker, Billy Branch, Ronnie Wood and Donald Fagen.

From March 2021 on, she had a successful Interview & Music Podcast series Globetrotting with Gillespie from TAM TV - Temple of Art & Music in London.

Selected discography

Foolish Seasons (London, PS 540, October 1968)
Box of Surprises (Decca, SKL 5012, 1969)
Jesus Christ Superstar (Original London Cast Recording) (MCA, 1973)
Weren't Born a Man (RCA, 1973)
Ain't Gonna Play No Second Fiddle (RCA, 1974)
Mojo Blues Band and the Rockin' Boogie Flu (Bellaphon, 1981)
Blue Job (Ace, 1982)
Solid Romance (Bellaphon, 1984)
Below the Belt (Ace, 1984)
It Belongs to Me (Bellaphon, 1985)
I'm a Woman (The Blues Line) (Bellaphon, 1986)
Move Your Body Close to Me (Bellaphon, 1986)
Hot News (Gig, 1987)
Sweet Meat (Blue Horizons, 1989)
Amor (Gig, 1989)
Blues It Up (Ace, 1990)
Left Hand Roller with Pewny Michael, (Bellaphon Records and Susy Records, 1990) 
Where Blue Begins (Ariola, 1991)
Boogie Woogie Nights (with Joachim Palden) (Wolf, 1991)
Big Boy (with Joachim Palden) (Wolf, 1992)
Methods of Release (Bellaphon, 1993)

Andy Warhol (Trident, 1994)
Blue One (Wolf, 1994)
Hot Stuff (Ace, 1995)
Have I Got Blues For You (Wolf, 1996)
Mustique Blues Festival (yearly since 1996) 
Cherry Pie (with Big Jay McNeely) (Big Jay Records, 1997)
One to One, Inner View, Dream On (under the pseudonym of Third Man) (1998)
Back to the Blues (Wolf, 1998)
Experienced (Ace, 2000)
Staying Power (Ace, 2003)
Sing Out (with Shanthi Sisters) (2004)
Sacred Space (2005)
Live (with the London Blues Band) (Ace, 2007)
Eternally Yours (2009)
Mata Mata (2011)
I Rest My Case (Ace, 2013)
Cats Meow (Ace, 2014)
Dana Gillespie meets Al Cook – Take It Off Slowly (Wolf, 2018)
Under My Bed (Ace, 2019)
Deep Pockets (Ace, 2021)

Filmography

 Fumo di Londra (1966)
 Secrets of a Windmill Girl (1966) - Singer
 The Vengeance of She (1968) - Girl at Party (uncredited)
 The Lost Continent (1968) - Sarah
 Mahler (1974) - Anna von Mildenburg
 The People That Time Forgot (1977) - Ajor
 The Hound of the Baskervilles (1978) - Mary Frankland
 Bad Timing (1980) - Amy Miller
 Scrubbers (1982) - Budd
 Parker (1986) - Monika
 Sterben werd ich um zu leben - Gustav Mahler (1987) - Anna von Mildenburg
 Strapless (1989) - Julie Kovago
 Sunday Pursuit (1990) - Maureen (final film role)
 Hotel India (2014) - Herself

See also
List of British actors

Bibliography
Bowie, Angela, Backstage Passes, Jove Books, Berkeley Publishing Group (1993)
Gillespie, Dana, Weren't Born a Man, Hawksmoor Publishing (2020)

References

External links

 Dana Gillespie, official site
 
 Dana Gillespie at HorrorStars
  2016 Interview with Souljourns

1949 births
Living people
English film actresses
English blues singers
English folk singers
English songwriters
Actresses from London
People from Woking
Singers from London
English women pop singers
British blues singers
Bellaphon Records artists
Ace Records (United Kingdom) artists